The Copa del Rey 2001 was the 65th edition of the Spanish basketball Cup. It was organized by the ACB and was disputed in Málaga in the Palacio Martín Carpena between days 15 and 18 of March, 2001. The winning team was FC Barcelona.

Brackett

Final

MVP of the Tournament: Pau Gasol

See also
Liga ACB
Copa del Rey de Baloncesto

External links
Linguasport Website

Copa del Rey de Baloncesto
2000–01 in Spanish basketball